Público is a Spanish online newspaper. It was published as a print daily newspaper between 2007 and 2012. The print version folded but the newspaper continues online.

History and profile
Público was established in September 2007. The founder is Jaume Roures, head of Mediapro. One of only two national left-wing papers (the other being elDiario.es), the paper had a harder-left editorial line than El País. Público also aimed at a younger readership. The paper was two-thirds the length of its competitors and its price, initially only 50 cents, was less than half. The paper's original press run was 250,000 daily.

After making financial losses for several years, and facing a €9 million deficit, Público folded its print edition in February 2012. In its last year, the paper was the ninth-largest general-interest newspaper in Spain and the fifth-largest of those headquartered in Madrid.

The parent company Mediapro undertook to continue to publish the website publico.es, which as of 2014 was still active as an online newspaper.

Público and CTXT, a Spanish independent online publication, began a collaborative editorial agreement in June 2016.

Editors

See also
 List of newspapers in Spain

References

External links
Público website

2007 establishments in Spain
2012 disestablishments in Spain
Defunct newspapers published in Spain
Daily newspapers published in Spain
Online newspapers with defunct print editions
Publications established in 2007
Publications disestablished in 2012
Spanish-language newspapers
Spanish-language websites
Spanish news websites